This is a list of energy cooperatives. A cooperative is an autonomous association of persons who voluntarily cooperate for their mutual social, economic, and cultural benefit. Cooperatives include non-profit community organizations and businesses that are owned and managed by the people who use its services (a consumer cooperative) or by the people who work there (a worker cooperative) or by the people who live there (a housing cooperative), hybrids such as worker cooperatives that are also consumer cooperatives or credit unions, multi-stakeholder cooperatives such as those that bring together civil society and local actors to deliver community needs, and second and third tier cooperatives whose members are other cooperatives.

A 2009 study found that 23% of the newly founded cooperatives in Germany were in the energy sector. These cooperatives primarily operate wind farms, bioenergy and photovoltaic farms with local and regional scope.

Energy cooperatives

Australia
 Hepburn Wind Project

Bolivia
 Cooperativa Rural de Electrificacion R.L. (CRE)

Belgium

 BeauVent
 BronsGroen
 Campina Energie
 CoopStroom
 Denderstroom
 Druifkracht
 ECoOB
 EnerGent
 Ecopower 
 Elecoo cv
Klimaan 
MegaWattPuur 
PajoPower 
Stroomvloed 
Vlaskracht 
Volterra 
Zonnewind 
ZuidtrAnt

Canada
 Ag Energy Co-operative
 WindShare

France
 Enercoop

Germany
In 2014 Germany had close to 1000 energy cooperatives, among them: 
Bürger Energie Region Regensburg eG (BERR)
Bürgerwerke eG
BürgerEnergie Buxtehude eG
BürgerEnergieAltmark eG
EnergieWende Erlangen und Erlangen-Höchstadt E- WERG eG
Elektrizitätswerke Schönau
Greenpeace Energy
HEG Heidelberger Energiegenossenschaft eG
Neue Energien West- NEW eG
Raiffeisen Bürger–Energiegenossenschaft Bliesgau eG
Regionalstrom Franken eG
Ur- Strom BürgerEnergieGenossenschaft Mainz eG
Windfang eG Frauenenergiegemeinschaft

Portugal
 Coopérnico

Serbia
 Elektropionir, Beograd
 Sunčani krovovi, Šabac

Spain
 Som Energia

Switzerland
 Elektra Birseck Münchenstein

Turkey
As of 2022 there are 9.

 Altınoluk Yenilenebilir Enerji Üretim Kooperatifi
 İzmir Enerji Kooperatifi
 Kayseri Mobilyacılar Yenilenebilir Enerji Kooperatifi
 Troya Yenilenebilir Enerji Kooperatifi

United Kingdom
 AWEL 
 Baywind Energy Co-operative 
 Brighton Energy Co-operative 
 Energy4All
 Fetlar Wind 
 MaidEnergy Coop
 Westmill Solar Co-operative 
 Westmill Wind Farm Co-operative

USA
 Isle au Haut Electric Power Company 
 Fox Islands Electric Cooperative 
 National Wind 
 Native Wind 
 Vineyard Power Co-operative
 Community wind energy – projects are locally owned by farmers, investors, businesses, schools, utilities, or other public or private entities who utilize wind energy to support and reduce energy costs to the local community

See also

 List of cooperatives
 List of co-operative federations
 List of employee-owned companies
 List of food cooperatives
 List of retailers' cooperatives
 List of worker cooperatives
 List of utility cooperatives

References

Energy cooperatives
Lists of cooperatives
Lists of energy companies